Republic of China Military Police Special Services Company (MPSSC; ; Code-named: Night Hawks) is a special forces unit of the military police of the Republic of China (Taiwan). This unit is stationed at Wugu, Taipei. Little is known about this unit, since informations regarding it are classified by the Ministry of National Defense. It was formed in 1978. According to the Taipei Times the MPSSC has a standing collaboration with United States Army Special Forces which includes regular joint exercises. They also have a standing invitation to the Pacific Area Special Operations Conference hosted annually by Special Operations Command Pacific.

History 
Following the 1972 Munich massacre and success of Operation Entebbe in 1976, in December 1977 the Ministry of National Defense was ordered to start the training and preparation for forming MPSSC, mainly because the rise of international terrorism has diffused internationally in the 1970s.

In 2020 it was revealed that the MPSSC was providing counter-terrorism training for the special operations forces of an unnamed Middle Eastern country.

New members of the Coast Guard’s Special Task Unit undergo two months of training with the Special Services Company following three months of training with the Amphibious Reconnaissance and Patrol Unit.

Equipment 
The SSC operates handheld non-projectile anti-drone weapons.

Centurion Arms CM4.

See also
 Airborne Special Service Company
 Thunder Squad
 List of military special forces units

References

External links

 ROC Military Police Command

1978 establishments in Taiwan
Special forces units of the Republic of China
Military police units and formations
Military counterterrorist organizations